Purnendu Sekhar Naskar (born March 1921, date of death unknown) was an Indian politician belonging to the Indian National Congress.He was elected from Mathurapur, and Diamond Harbour, West Bengal  to the Lok Sabha, lower house of the Parliament of India.

References

External links
Official biographical sketch in Parliament of India website

1921 births
Date of death missing
India MPs 1952–1957
India MPs 1957–1962
India MPs 1962–1967
Indian National Congress politicians
Lok Sabha members from West Bengal
People from West Bengal